The 2013 Stockholm Ladies Cup was held from September 20 to 22 at the Danderyd Curling Arena in Stockholm, Sweden as part of the 2013–14 World Curling Tour. The event was held in a triple-knockout format, and the purse for the event was 200,000 SEK, of which the winner, Silvana Tirinzoni, received 70,000 SEK. Tirinzoni defeated Michèle Jäggi in the final with a score of 3–2.

Teams
The teams are listed as follows:

Knockout results
The draw is listed as follows:

A event

B event

C event

Playoffs

References

External links

Stockholm Ladies Cup
2013 in Swedish women's sport
2013 in women's curling
2010s in Stockholm
September 2013 sports events in Europe